Addisonia may refer to:
 Addisonia Rusby, 1893, a synonym of Helogyne Nutt., 1841, a genus of flowering plants in the family Asteraceae
 Addisonia Dall, 1882, a genus of sea snails in the family Addisoniidae
 Addisonia (journal), an illustrated journal, published by the New York Botanical Garden from 1916 to 1964